Statist may refer to:
Anything pertaining to the political ideology of Statism
Statists (Belgium), a conservative political faction during the Brabant Revolution
The Statist, a British magazine which closed in 1967